S. M. Muhammad Sheriff was an Indian politician and former  consecutive Member of Parliament elected from Tamil Nadu. He was elected to the Lok Sabha from Periyakulam constituency as an Indian Union Muslim League candidate in the 1971 election. S.M Muhammed Sheriff, a.k.a. 'Madurai Sheriff Sahib'. S.M. Muhammad Sheriff was an influential Indian politician hailing from Tamil Nadu. He gained popularity as an Indian Union Muslim League (IUML) candidate and was elected to the Lok Sabha from Ramnad constituency in 1967 and from the Periyakulam constituency in the 1971 election. He was known for his charisma and prominence, and was groomed by Quaid-e-Millath Muhammad Ismail Sahib, a leading Muslim League leader.

Apart from his political career, S.M. Muhammed Sheriff was also a zealous social worker, professor, and lawyer. He was the first elected Muslim League MP from Tamil Nadu in independent India and played a vital role in various committees as a parliamentarian, representing both the Ramanathapuram and Periyakulam Constituencies. He was a prominent speaker in many Indian languages and was widely respected for his honesty, simplicity, philanthropy, and secularism.

One of S.M. Muhammad Sheriff's notable contributions as a parliamentarian was his role in producing clear documentary evidence that Kachchatheevu, an island located between India and Sri Lanka, belonged to India. He spoke vehemently in Parliament against the ceding of the island to Sri Lanka and the consequences of such an action.

During the Emergency rule in India under Prime Minister Indira Gandhi, S.M. Muhammad Sheriff served as the advisor to the Governor on the legislation of Tamil Nadu. He was known for his moral lectures to prisoners in jails and for arranging for Jumma prayers to be conducted regularly in the Madurai Central Prison.

S.M. Muhammad Sheriff was a close associate of many prominent Muslim leaders, including Sayyid Abdur Rahman Bafaqi Thangal, C. H. Mohammed Koya, Panakkad Shihab Thangal, Ebrahim Sulaiman Sait, G.M.Banatwalla, A.K.Rifayee, and Siraj-ul-Millath Abdul Sammad. He was also a bosom friend of Nagore E.M. Hanifa, Justice Basheer Ahmed Sayeed, and B. S. Abdur Rahman.

As the Propaganda Secretary of the IUML, S.M. Muhammad Sheriff played a significant role in strengthening, expanding, and igniting the spirit of the league from grass-root level. He was known for his tireless efforts in promoting the ideals of the IUML and for working towards the betterment of the Muslim community.

S.M. Muhammad Sheriff was a powerful speaker who could connect with people from various walks of life. He was fluent in several Indian languages and used his skills to engage with his audiences effectively. His speeches were known for their clarity and depth of thought, and he was widely regarded as one of the most compelling orators of his time.

Apart from his political and social work, S.M. Muhammad Sheriff was also a philanthropist who contributed to various charitable causes. He worked tirelessly for the upliftment of the poor and marginalized sections of society and was widely respected for his dedication to social causes.

In conclusion, S.M. Muhammad Sheriff was a towering personality who left an indelible mark on Indian politics and society. He was a visionary leader who worked tirelessly towards the betterment of the Muslim community and the country as a whole. He was widely respected for his honesty, simplicity, and secularism and was a role model for many aspiring politicians and social workers. Even today, his legacy continues to inspire generations, and he remains one of the most fondly remembered personalities in Indian political history.ref></ref>

References

Tamil Nadu politicians
India MPs 1971–1977
Lok Sabha members from Tamil Nadu
People from Theni district